Allaegopis is a genus of gastropods belonging to the family Zonitidae.

The species of this genus are found in Greece.

Species:

Allaegopis amphikypellon 
Allaegopis corcyrensis 
Allaegopis jonicus 
Allaegopis kerketianus 
Allaegopis meridionalis 
Allaegopis skanderbegianus 
Allaegopis subariedeli 
Allaegopis transiens

References

Zonitidae